Heavenly Grassland (Chinese: Tian Shang Cao Yuan) is a 2002 Chinese movie directed by Sai Fu and Mai Lisi starring Naren Hua, Ning Cai, and Tumen.

Plot
The film tells about young Han Chinese boy Tiger (Ning Cai), who is adopted by a family living in the steppes of Inner Mongolia.

The boy's father asks Shergan (Tuman) to look after his child while in prison. Shergan keeps his word and brings the boy to Mongolia, where he shares his yurt with his "feisty" ex-wife Baruma (Naren Hua). The boy is at first shocked and repelled by the way of life of the people there, but in time learns to love his new homeland. The film's "strong spectacular and exotic qualities and appealing performances" were noted, as was the possibility that the Chinese-Mongolian relations weren't "quite as harmonious as the film suggests" at the time of the film's release.

The movie won Best Photography Award at the China Golden Rooster Awards. Naren Hua's performance was particularly praised and won her several accolades, including the Shanghai Film Critics Awards for Best Actress.

Cast
 Guersireng	
 Naren Hua
 Ning Cai	
 Tu Men

References

External links
 

2002 films
2000s Mandarin-language films
2002 drama films
Chinese drama films
2000s Chinese films